Loichangamatak is a settlement in Kenya's Rift Valley Province.

In 2022, the China State Engineering Corporation Limited began upgrading the 40-km road between Loichangamatak and Lokichar.

References 

Populated places in Turkana County